The 1962 Grand Prix motorcycle racing season was the 14th F.I.M. Road Racing World Championship Grand Prix season. The season consisted of eleven Grand Prix races in six classes: 500cc, 350cc, 250cc, 125cc, 50cc and Sidecars 500cc. It began on 6 May, with Spanish Grand Prix and ended with Argentine Grand Prix on 14 October. Defending 350cc and 500cc world champion Gary Hocking was deeply affected by the death of his friend, Tom Phillis at the 1962 Isle of Man TT and, announced his retirement from motorcycle racing after winning the 1962 Senior TT. Hocking's MV Agusta teammate, Mike Hailwood went on to win his first 500cc world championship.

1962 Grand Prix season calendar

Standings

Scoring system
Points were awarded to the top six finishers in each race. Only the best of six races were counted in 50cc, 125cc, 250cc championships, best of five in 350cc and 500cc championships, while in the Sidecars, the best of four races were counted.

500cc final standings

350cc standings

250cc standings

125cc standings

50cc standings

References

 Büla, Maurice & Schertenleib, Jean-Claude (2001). Continental Circus 1949-2000. Chronosports S.A. 

Grand Prix motorcycle racing seasons
Grand Prix motorcycle racing season